Eupaludestrina is a genus of gastropods belonging to the family Cochliopidae.

The species of this genus are found in Europe.

Species:
Eupaludestrina achaja 
Eupaludestrina acilacustris 
Eupaludestrina aponensis 
Eupaludestrina bigugliana 
Eupaludestrina canariensis 
Eupaludestrina contempta 
Eupaludestrina dalmatica 
Eupaludestrina dobrogica 
Eupaludestrina foxianensis 
Eupaludestrina galileae  (Semisalsa galilaea)
Eupaludestrina longiscata  (Semisalsa longiscata)
Eupaludestrina macei 
Eupaludestrina maltzani 
Eupaludestrina musaensis 
Eupaludestrina rausiana 
Eupaludestrina rhoenana 
Eupaludestrina scamandri 
Eupaludestrina spinellii 
Eupaludestrina stagnorum  (Semisalsa stagnorum)
Eupaludestrina steindachneri 
Eupaludestrina sublongiscata

References

Gastropods